Colonel Sir Henry Abel Smith,  (8 March 1900 – 24 January 1993) was a British Army officer who served as Governor of Queensland, Australia. He married Lady May Cambridge, a niece of Queen Mary, consort of King George V.

Early life and family
Abel Smith was born in London on 8 March 1900, the eldest son of Lieutenant Colonel Francis Abel Smith (1861–1908) of Wilford House, Nottinghamshire, and of Cole Orton Hall, Leicestershire, and of Selsdon Park, a descendant of the prominent banking Smith family founded by Abel Smith (1717–1788), by his wife Madeline St. Maur Seymour (1862–1951), a descendant of Edward Seymour, 8th Duke of Somerset.

His grandparents were Henry Abel Smith (1826–1890) and Elizabeth Mary Pym (1826–1877), a daughter of Francis Pym (1790–1860) and Lady Lucy Leslie-Meville (1796–1848), a daughter of Alexander Leslie-Melville, 9th Earl of Leven. His younger brother was Brigadier Sir Alexander Abel Smith (1904–1980), whose second wife was Henriette Alice Cadogan (d.2005), a descendant of the 4th Earl Cadogan, who between 1949 and 1987 served as a lady-in-waiting to Princess Elizabeth (later Queen Elizabeth II).

Career
Abel Smith attended Eton College and subsequently the Royal Military College, Sandhurst, where on 17 December 1919 he was commissioned as a second lieutenant into the Royal Horse Guards. Promoted on 17 December 1921 to lieutenant, between 1928–30 he served as aide-de-camp (ADC) to Alexander Cambridge, 1st Earl of Athlone, whose daughter he later married. He was promoted to captain on 1 February 1930 and major on 26 June 1934.

Abel Smith served in the Second World War, where from 1941 to 1945 he commanded the 2nd Household Cavalry Regiment, leading it throughout the entire North West Europe Campaign from June 1944 shortly after D-Day to Victory in Europe Day in May 1945. He was awarded the Distinguished Service Order in February 1945. In 1944 he was promoted to lieutenant colonel and in 1946 colonel. He retired as a colonel in 1950. In 1953 he was appointed a Deputy Lieutenant of Berkshire. On 18 March 1958 Abel Smith was appointed Governor of Queensland in Australia and served in that office until 18 March 1966.

Marriage and progeny
On 24 October 1931, at St. Mary's Church, Balcombe, Sussex, Abel Smith married Lady May Cambridge, the only surviving child of his former commander, Alexander Cambridge, 1st Earl of Athlone. She was born Princess May of Teck, and was a niece of King George V and Queen Mary, and a great-granddaughter of Queen Victoria. By his wife he had three children:
Anne Mary Sibylla Abel Smith (born 28 July 1932); she married David Liddell-Grainger (26 January 1930 – 12 March 2007) on 14 December 1957; they were divorced in 1981 but have five children and eight grandchildren. Her eldest son is the Conservative Member of Parliament Ian Liddell-Grainger.
Colonel Richard Francis Abel Smith (11 October 1933 – 23 December 2004); he married Marcia Kendrew (born 27 March 1940) on 28 April 1960; she is a daughter of Sir Douglas Kendrew, a Governor of Western Australia; they have one daughter and four grandchildren.
Elizabeth Alice Abel Smith (born 5 September 1936); she married Peter Wise (29 December 1929 – 16 November 2021) on 29 April 1965; they divorced in 1975 and had one daughter who died as an infant.

Death and burial
Abel Smith died at home at Barton Lodge, Winkfield, Berkshire, on 24 January 1993 aged 92, just weeks away from his 93rd birthday. His funeral service took place at St. George's Chapel, Windsor Castle. His cremated remains were buried at the Royal Burial Ground, Frogmore. His wife survived him by sixteen months.

Honours
 1961: Knight Commander of the Order of St Michael and St George (KCMG)
 1958: Knight of Justice of the Most Venerable Order of the Hospital of Saint John of Jerusalem (KStJ)
 1950: Knight Commander of the Royal Victorian Order (KCVO)
 1945: Distinguished Service Order (DSO)

References

External links

British Army Officers 1939–1945

1900 births
1993 deaths
British Army personnel of World War II
Burials at the Royal Burial Ground, Frogmore
Companions of the Distinguished Service Order
Deputy Lieutenants of Berkshire
Governors of Queensland
Graduates of the Royal Military College, Sandhurst
Knights Commander of the Order of St Michael and St George
Knights Commander of the Royal Victorian Order
Knights of Justice of the Order of St John
People from Mayfair
Royal Horse Guards officers
Henry
Military personnel from London
People educated at Ludgrove School